Giovanni Scifoni (born 23 May 1976 in Rome) is an Italian actor and theatre director.  After musical studies (piano, singing) and first steps as a comic strip writer, he was selected to attend the Accademia Nazionale di Arte Drammatica Silvio D'Amico.

Right after graduation from the Accademia, he acted in various Italian tours of several national theater stars like  Paolo Poli, Roberto Guicciardini, Sebastiano Lo Monaco and Patrick Rossi Gastaldi. He started also a collaboration as actor and director with the international company Gen Rosso.

He debuted in cinema with the Cannes-prized movie of Marco Tullio Giordana La meglio gioventù (The Best of Youth), acting as Berto.
The first starring role was in Mio figlio, followed by its sequel Io e mio figlio - Nuove storie per il commissario Vivaldi. Then followed several fiction movies.

As a theater actor and writer he got the "Golden Graal" prize  "Astro Nascente del Teatro" in 2011.

He's Roman Catholic.

Filmography
 La meglio gioventù, directed by Marco Tullio Giordana
 Mio figlio, directed by Luciano Odorisio
 Alba tremula, directed by Fabio Ianera
 L'onore e il rispetto, directed by Salvatore Samperi
 Io non dimentico, directed by Luciano Odorisio
 Un caso di coscienza 3, directed by Luigi Perelli
 Don Matteo 6, directed by Giulio Base, Fabrizio Costa and Elisabetta Marchetti - episode: La stanza di un angelo, directed by Elisabetta Marchetti (2008)
 Io e mio figlio - Nuove storie per il commissario Vivaldi, directed by Luciano Odorisio -
 Il peccato e la vergogna, directed by Luigi Parisi and Alessio Inturri
 Un medico in famiglia 7 - Rai Uno (2011)
 Pasolini, la verita' nascosta, directed by Federico Bruno
 Paura di amare 2, directed by Vincenzo Terracciano

References

External links
 

Italian male film actors
Italian male television actors
Male actors from Rome
Accademia Nazionale di Arte Drammatica Silvio D'Amico alumni
Italian theatre directors
1976 births
Living people
21st-century Italian male actors
Italian Roman Catholics